Amende honorable was originally a mode of punishment in France which required the offender, barefoot and stripped to his shirt, and led into a church or auditory with a torch in his hand and a rope round his neck held by the public executioner, to beg pardon on his knees of his God, his king, and his country.

By acknowledging their guilt, the offender made it clear, implicitly or explicitly, that they would refrain from future misconduct and would not seek revenge. Often used as a political punishment, and sometimes as an alternative to execution, it would sometimes serve as an acknowledgement of defeat and an instrument to restore peace.

The term is now used to denote a satisfactory apology or reparation.

In History

Origins
Despite its name, the Amende honorable is a ritual of public humiliation, which origins can be traced back to the Roman ritual of deditio/receptio in fidem.

From the 9th to the 14th century, a punishment called Harmiscara in Latin (Harmschar in German, Haschiée in French), consisting in carrying a dog or a saddle, was used to punish members of the nobility who had outraged the monarch or the church. Such a punishment was imposed, for example, in 1155 by Frederick Barbarossa to punish those who have troubled the peace in the Holy Roman Empire.

In a similar fashion, In 1347, the Burghers of Calais presented themselves in shirt and rope around their necks to beg the forgiveness of King Edward III, offended by the city's refusal to submit to him - a ritual that may have biblical origins.

The term "Amende honorable" seems to spread during the 14th and 15th centuries - historian Jean-Marie Moeglin notes that Enguerrand de Monstrelet used it in the context of the reparations requested by the Duchess of Orleans after the assassination of her husband, Duke Louis of Orleans. It appeared in the acts of Parliament at roughly the same time, in an agreement of 1401.

During the 15th century, the Amende honorable seems a rather common form of punishment administered by ecclesiastical courts. Studying the forms of punishment pronounced by the judicial vicar of Cambray, Véronique Beaulande-Barraud finds the Amende honorable to be among the most common sentence, rarer than fines in wax but as common as prison terms and excommunications.

However, the Amende honorable rarely constitutes the full sanction, but generally a complement to other forms of punishment, such as banishment, pilgrimages, jail or even death sentences. Nicole Gothier notes:

Amende honorable by John the Fearless (1408)
The first widely known example of Amende honorable is the one made by Duke of Burgundy John the Fearless, after the murder of Duke Louis of Orleans in 1408:

Amable Guillaume Prosper Brugière, baron de Barante thus describes the ordeal:

Grande Rebeyne revolt (1529)

After the failed Grande Rebeyne revolt in Lyon, several rebels were sentenced to an Amende honorable in the streets of the city:

Amende honorable as part of the execution of Robert-François Damiens (1757)
The amende honorable was sometimes incorporated into a larger ritual of capital punishment (specifically the French version of drawing and quartering) for parricides and regicides; this is described in the 1975 book Discipline and Punish by Michel Foucault, notably in reference to Robert-François Damiens who was condemned to make the amende honorable before the main door of the Church of Paris in 1757.

In the arts

In Victor Hugo's The Hunchback of Notre-Dame, the death sentence imposed on Esmeralda includes an amende honorable:

L'Amende Honorable is the name of an 1831 painting by Eugène Delacroix - it depicts an imaginary scene, taking place in the 16th century in the Palace of Justice in Rouen, in which  a monk is dragged before the Bishop of Madrid for rebelling against his orders.

Alphonse Legros also painted an Amende Honorable (around 1868), depicting a religious court at the time of the Inquisition.

References

Punishments